Time/Life (subtitled (Song for the Whales and Other Beings)) is an album by Charlie Haden's Liberation Music Orchestra arranged by composer and pianist Carla Bley and released on the Impulse! label in 2016. It features two tracks from Haden's final live performance with the Orchestra along with additional studio recordings completed after his death.

Reception 

Allmusic awarded the album 4½ stars and said it was "an atmospheric, elegiac album inspired by Haden's longstanding love and concern for the environment" and noted "What is also particularly compelling about Time/Life is how well the live recordings blend with the studio tracks. Much of this is due to Bley, whose arranging and spare, harmonic piano skills bridge the recordings and help elevate the album to one of the best in the LMO's catalog". They also selected it as one of their Favorite Jazz Albums of 2016. Writing in The Guardian, John Fordham observed "These five pieces (with Haden playing on two, and his bass deputy Steve Swallow on the others) include the classic Miles Davis/Bill Evans ballad "Blue in Green" – featuring a typically spare and throbbing Haden solo and gorgeous tenor sax playing from Tony Malaby and Chris Cheek – and Carla Bley’s slow-burn throwback to earlier Liberation Music days in the march-time snare-drum beat of the title track". The Observer'''s Dave Gelly said "the orchestra’s unrestrained sound suggests the luxuriance of nature. The first solo of the whole set is taken by Haden himself, his dark, woody tone quite unmistakable. It may have been his last". Cormac Larkin of The Irish Times'' said "It opens and closes with live recordings – among the last made before Haden’s death in 2014 – including a luminous version of Miles Davis’s Blue in Green. The rest of this powerful, emotionally charged album was recorded by his grieving fellow musicians the day after Haden’s memorial service in New York, and is a fitting farewell to a great and courageous musician".

Track listing
All compositions by Carla Bley except where noted.
 "Blue in Green" (Miles Davis) – 8:16
 "Time/Life" – 14:19
 "Silent Spring" – 11:43 	
 "Útviklingssang" – 7:55
 "Song for the Whales" (Charlie Haden) – 11:43

Personnel
Charlie Haden (tracks 1 & 5), Steve Swallow (tracks 2–4) – bass
Carla Bley – piano, arranger, conductor
Seneca Black, Michael Rodriguez – trumpet & flugelhorn
Vincent Chancey – French horn
Curtis Fowlkes – trombone
Joseph Daley – tuba
Loren Stillman – alto saxophone
Chris Cheek, Tony Malaby – tenor saxophone  
Steve Cardenas – guitar
Matt Wilson – drums

References

Charlie Haden albums
Impulse! Records albums
Carla Bley albums
2016 albums